Lal Bahadur Shastri was sworn in as Prime Minister of India on 9 June 1964. In his ministry, the ministers were as follows.

Cabinet

Cabinet Ministers
Key
  Died in office
  Resigned

|}

Ministers of State

|}

References

Further reading
 Inder Malhotra (23 July 2012) In Nehru's oversized shoes - The Indian Express

Indian union ministries
1964 establishments in India
Shastri administration
1966 disestablishments in India
Cabinets established in 1964
Cabinets disestablished in 1966
Memorials to Lal Bahadur Shastri